Pedro Ortíz may refer to:

 Pedro Zambrano Ortiz (born 1586), Spanish Franciscan friar
 Pedro Ortiz Dávila (1912–1986), Puerto Rican singer
 Pedro Ortíz (Mexican athlete), Mexican middle-distance runner at the 1932 Summer Olympics
 Pedro Ortiz (Colombian athlete) (born 1956), Colombian long-distance runner at the 1988 Summer Olympics
 Pedro Ortíz (footballer, born 1990), Ecuadorian football goalkeeper for Emelec
 Pedro Ortiz (footballer, born 2000), Spanish football midfielder for Sevilla Athletic